Carrier Command is a 1988 video game published by Rainbird for the Amiga, Atari ST, IBM PC compatibles, ZX Spectrum, Macintosh, Commodore 64, and Amstrad CPC. Carrier Command is a cross between a vehicle simulation game and a real-time strategy game where players control a robotic aircraft carrier.

Plot

The game is set in the near future, where a team of scientists have developed two robotic aircraft carriers to colonise an archipelago of sixty four islands. Unfortunately, the more advanced carrier falls into the hands of a terrorist organization, and they plan to conquer the archipelago for their own evil ends. It is the player's job to use the less advanced carrier to colonise the islands and destroy the enemy carrier.

Reception

The Games Machine awarded the Atari ST and Amiga versions 98% and 97% respectively and ranked Carrier Command the #1 game of 1988. ACE (Advanced Computer Entertainment) scored the PC version 965/1000, while Zzap!64 magazine awarded the Amiga release 92%. The game was ranked the 15th best game of all time by Amiga Power.

Computer Gaming World in 1988 praised the game's blend of strategic and tactical play, recommending it as an improvement over Starglider. A 1992 survey in the magazine of wargames with modern settings gave the game two and a half stars out of five, describing it as a "futuristic arcade game", and two 1994 surveys gave it two stars. The ZX Spectrum version was awarded a "Crash Smash" with 97%, and was awarded 94% by Your Sinclair, and was placed at number 12 in the Your Sinclair official top 100.

In 1991, PC Format named Carrier Command one of the 50 best computer games ever. The editors called it "a splendid mixture of strategic planning and arcade action". Carrier Command was named the 56th best computer game ever by PC Gamer UK in 1997. The editors wrote that it "packs more flight-sim, sea-sim and tank-sim action and strategy than a dozen of your so-called CD-ROM games could manage in a million or more megabytes."

Legacy
Carrier Command was followed by Battle Command, where the player controls a tank.

Hostile Waters: Antaeus Rising (2001) was inspired by Carrier Command and has many similarities.

Carrier Command: Gaea Mission (2012) is a modern remake by Bohemia Interactive's Prague studio. It's a real-time action/strategy game, where the overarching objective is to conquer and control islands. It features a vast 33-island archipelago on the planet-moon Taurus.

Carrier Command 2 was announced in December 2020. It was published by the reconstituted Microprose and was released August 10, 2021 on Steam. Included in the purchase is a virtual reality version of the game. There is a multiplayer component using invitation systems through Steam or by invitation code. Players cooperatively play utilizing different stations aboard the carrier deck. The sequel received mixed reviews, with The Games Machine rating it 6.7/10 points and calling its gameplay "brilliant" but "brought down by obtuse and ancient systems".

References

External links
 

1988 video games
Aircraft carriers in fiction
Amiga games
Amstrad CPC games
Atari ST games
Classic Mac OS games
Commodore 64 games
DOS games
First-person strategy video games
Golden Joystick Award winners
Microplay Software games
Naval video games
Real-time strategy video games
Ship simulation games
Single-player video games
Telecomsoft games
Vehicle simulation games
Video games scored by David Lowe
Video games scored by David Whittaker
Video games developed in the United Kingdom
ZX Spectrum games